Metropolis: The Chase Suite, sometimes known as Metropolis: Suite I (The Chase),  is the debut extended play (EP) by American recording artist Janelle Monáe, released August 24, 2007 on Bad Boy Records. Produced by Monáe, Control Z, and Chuck Lightning, the EP constitutes the first installment of Monáe's seven-part Metropolis conceptual series.

The EP debuted at number 115 on the US Billboard 200 chart, selling 5,200 copies in its first week. It was re-released as a special edition on August 12, 2008 and produced three singles, "Violet Stars Happy Hunting!!!", "Sincerely, Jane.", and "Many Moons".

Upon its release, Metropolis: Suite I (The Chase) received critical acclaim from music critics, with "Many Moons" being nominated for Best Urban/Alternative Performance at the 51st Annual Grammy Awards.

Concept
Metropolis: Suite I (The Chase) is the first installment of Monáe's seven-part Metropolis conceptual series, inspired by Fritz Lang's science fiction classic film, Metropolis (1927). It follows a fictional tale of android Cindi Mayweather who is mass-produced in the year 2719 for a market filled with severe social stratification. Mayweather falls in love with a human, and is sentenced to disassembly.

Critical reception

Metropolis received critical acclaim upon its release. Mark Nero from About.com gave the EP a positive review saying "Though she's new to the mainstream, the quirky, highly-talented singer Janelle Monae has been putting out music for years. ... If you've heard the original version of the EP, there's no need to pick this up unless you're a diehard fan, but if this is your first exposure to Janelle's music, you're in for a treat. Hip-Hop DX gave the EP a positive review saying, "Even without the random interplanetary references and notions of forbidden robot love, Metropolis has the type of production that takes its cues from something made in the past, as well as the future. The drums hit hard, and when combined with the synth keys, strings and the occasional electric guitar, they make for an oddly enjoyable mix." The Kansas City Star gave the EP a positive review.

Commercial performance
Metropolis: Suite I had minor success in the United States where it peaked at number 115 on the US Billboard 200 chart and fared much better on the R&B/Hip-Hop Albums chart at number 20. The album also charted on the Top Heatseekers chart at number two. The EP spent one week on the Billboard 200, but spent 9 weeks altogether on both the R&B/Hip-Hop Albums chart and the Top Heatseekers chart.

Track listing

Personnel
Credits for Metropolis: Suite I (The Chase) adapted from AllMusic.

 Terrence Brown – piano, strings
 Control_z – engineer, drum programming, mastering, mixing
 Cutmaster Swift – scratching, cut
 Brian Davis – graphic design, concept, layout design, creation
 Provi Fulp – concept, stylist, creation
 Bernie Grundman – mastering
 Jaspects – horn section, trumpet, alto sax, tenor sax
 Chuck Lightning – concept, story, creation
 Lord Of The Cybersoul Patrol – executive production
 Lord Mitchell A. "MitchOW!ski" Martian – mastering, mixing, concept, assistant, creation
 Janelle Monáe – hammond organ, vocals, background vocals, production, executive production, concept, soloist, creation, voiceover
 Emily "Widget" Parker – concept, creation
 Kellindo Parker – concept, creation
 Kellis Jr. Parker – guitar, soloist
 Antwan "Big Boi" Patton – executive production
 Donna Permell – photography, concept, creation
 George "Rico" Rodriguez – concept, creation
 Ben Rose – photography, concept, creation
 Skunks – snaps
 Chris Stanford – photography, concept, creation
 Delvin Stanklin – concept, creation
 Sweetfish – bass
 Wolfmaster Lightning – arranger, vocals, production, associate production, associate arranger
 Wolfmaster Z – organ, synthesizer, guitar, piano, arranger, keyboards, electric piano, programming, vocals, production, artwork, graphic design, mastering, mixing, concept, layout design, instrumentation, creation
 Wolfmasters – executive production
 Wondaland Arts Society – creative director, concept, creation

Charts

References

External links
 Metropolis: Suite I (The Chase) at Discogs

2007 debut EPs
Bad Boy Records EPs
Metropolis albums
2007 debut albums
Contemporary R&B EPs
Funk EPs
Dance music EPs
Dance-punk albums
New wave albums by American artists
New wave EPs
Pop music EPs
Soul EPs